The Grand Prix de Fourmies is a bicycle race held in the Fourmies commune of France. Since 2005 it has been organised as a 1.HC event on the UCI Europe Tour.

List of winners

External links
  

 
Recurring sporting events established in 1928
1928 establishments in France
Cycle races in France
UCI Europe Tour races
Tourist attractions in Nord (French department)
Sport in Nord (French department)
Super Prestige Pernod races